Never Rarely Sometimes Always is a 2020 drama film written and directed by Eliza Hittman. It stars Sidney Flanigan (in her acting debut), Talia Ryder, Théodore Pellerin, Ryan Eggold and Sharon Van Etten. It had its world premiere at the Sundance Film Festival on January 24, 2020. It was also selected to compete for the Golden Bear in the main competition section at the 70th Berlin International Film Festival, where it won the Silver Bear Grand Jury Prize. The film was released in the United States on March 13, 2020, by Focus Features. It received widespread acclaim from critics, with praise aimed at Flanigan’s performance and Hittman’s direction.

Plot 
Seventeen-year-old Autumn Callahan suspects she is pregnant and goes to a crisis pregnancy center. At the center, she takes a drug store test that confirms that she is pregnant. She gets told that she is 10 weeks along and is given literature on adoption and is shown an anti-abortion video.

After learning that she is unable to get an abortion in Pennsylvania without parental consent, she tries to induce a miscarriage by swallowing pills and punching herself in the stomach. When those methods fail, she confides in her cousin, Skylar, that she is pregnant. Skylar steals cash from the grocery store where they work, and the two buy bus tickets to New York City.

On the bus they meet Jasper, a young man who is persistently interested in Skylar even though she tries to blow him off.
 
At the Planned Parenthood clinic, Autumn learns that the crisis pregnancy center lied to her about how far along she was and that she is actually 18 weeks pregnant. Though she is still able to get an abortion, she must go to a secondary clinic the following morning in order to have the abortion performed.

Autumn and Skylar spend an uncomfortable night riding the subway and playing games at an arcade. The following morning at the clinic, Autumn learns that a second-trimester abortion is a two-day procedure and that paying for the abortion will wipe out most of her funds. The counselor also asks her a series of questions about her sexual partners which reveal that Autumn's partners have been physically and sexually abusive.

Out of money, Skylar realizes the two have no way of going home. As Autumn refuses to let Skylar call either of their mothers, Skylar reaches out to Jasper, who takes them bowling and to karaoke. At the end of the night, Skylar asks Jasper to loan them the money for their bus tickets, and he agrees. Skylar leaves with Jasper to find an ATM, and Autumn later goes looking for them. She finds them kissing. Realizing Skylar is only going along with it for the loan, Autumn discreetly grabs Skylar's hand to comfort her.

In the morning, Autumn goes to her appointment and has the abortion. Autumn and Skylar go to a restaurant, where Skylar asks her questions about the procedure, but Autumn remains vague. The two ride a bus back to Pennsylvania.

Cast
 Sidney Flanigan as Autumn Callahan 
 Talia Ryder as Skylar
 Théodore Pellerin as Jasper
 Ryan Eggold as Ted
 Sharon Van Etten as Mother
 Kelly Chapman as Social Worker
 Kim Rios Lin as Anesthesiologist
 Drew Seltzer as Manager Rick
 Carolina Espiro as Financial Advisor

Production
In April 2019, it was announced Sidney Flanigan, Talia Ryder, Théodore Pellerin, Ryan Eggold and Sharon Van Etten had joined the cast of the film, with Eliza Hittman directing from a screenplay she wrote. Adele Romanski and Sara Murphy produced the film under their Pastel Productions banner, while Rose Garnett, Tim Headington, Elika Portnoy and Alex Orlovsky executive produced the film under their BBC Films and Tango Entertainment banners respectively. Focus Features was slated to distribute.

The film shot for a total of 29 days in March and April 2019, in New York City and Shamokin, Pennsylvania.

Release
Never Rarely Sometimes Always had its world premiere at the Sundance Film Festival on January 24, 2020. It was released in the United States on March 13, 2020. Due to the COVID-19 pandemic, the film was released on video on demand on April 3, 2020. Focus debated re-releasing the film theatrically but was concerned about competition once theaters re-opened. It was released through video on demand in the United Kingdom on May 13, 2020, after being initially planned for a theatrical release.

Reception

Box office 
In theaters, Never Rarely Sometimes Always grossed $891,527,

Critical response 
The site's critical consensus reads, "Powerfully acted and directed, Never Rarely Sometimes Always reaffirms writer-director Eliza Hittman as a filmmaker of uncommon sensitivity and grace." On Metacritic, the film has a weighted average score of 92 out of 100, based on 38 critics, indicating "universal acclaim".

Critics praised the film for its approach to visual storytelling and naturalistic acting, particularly the film’s avoidance of polemic to focus on the lives of and the bond between its two female lead characters. Justin Chang of the Los Angeles Times wrote, “What makes ‘Never Rarely Sometimes Always’ so forceful — and certainly the most searingly confrontational American drama about abortion rights in recent memory — is its quality of understatement, its determination to build its argument not didactically but cinematically.” Richard Lawson of Vanity Fair voiced a similar sentiment, saying “It’s rare that the topic of abortion gets such a empathetic and holistic film treatment: passionate but unsentimental, principled without any predetermined moral.” Chang concluded, “if the picture Hittman paints is stirringly bleak, it is not without its passages of tentative hope, even grace.”

Karen Han of Polygon wrote, “The slow build-up — and Autumn and Skylar’s stoicism through it all — makes it all the more affecting when the reasoning behind the film’s title is revealed.”

Naomi Fry of The New Yorker said, “In its profound sensitivity to everyday detail, ‘Never Rarely Sometimes Always’ makes the viewer aware of the mundane challenges that dog every step its heroines manage to take along that path—from the large, cheap suitcase bumped along with difficulty on subway steps, to the dwindling-down-to-nothing funds in a secreted-away pouch, to the flutter-lidded, late-night dozes taken on the subway, in lieu of a place to stay, waiting out the hours.”

Critic Mark Kermode gave the film a 5-star rating and wrote, “Perfectly pitched and sensitively played, this is truthful, powerful and profoundly moving fare from a film-maker at the very top of her game” and added the film “is perhaps best described as a perfectly observed portrait of female friendship; a coming-of-age story with road-movie inflections, piercingly honest and deeply affecting.” Kermode also lauded cinematographer Hélène Louvart, “who here manages to capture moments of intense intimacy in unobtrusive fashion. Through her camera, we become both observers and participants – watching these young women’s lives but also empathetically experiencing their shared journeys.”

Accolades

References

External links
 
 
 Script 

2020 films
2020 drama films
American drama films
British drama films
BBC Film films
2020s English-language films
Films about abortion
Films directed by Eliza Hittman
Films set in New York City
Films set in Pennsylvania
Films shot in New York City
Films shot in Pennsylvania
Focus Features films
Silver Bear Grand Jury Prize winners
Teenage pregnancy in film
Sundance Film Festival award winners
2020s feminist films
American independent films
2020 independent films
2020s female buddy films
2020s American films
2020s British films